Storia (Italian: "history") or La storia may refer to:

 "Storia" (song), a 2009 single performed by Japanese girl group Kalafina
 "La Storia", single and lead track from Francesco De Gregori's 1985 studio album Scacchi e tarocchi ("Chess and Tarots")
 La storia (1974), an historical novel by Italian author Elsa Morante
 La storia, a 1998 compilation album by Rino Gaetano
 Daihatsu Storia, a Japanese automobile

See also
 Stória, stória... (2009), the second studio album of Cape Verdean singer Mayra Andrade